John Knox House, popularly known as John Knox's House, is an historic house in Edinburgh, Scotland, reputed to have been owned and lived in by Protestant reformer John Knox during the 16th century. Although his name became associated with the house, he appears to have lived in Warriston Close where a plaque indicates the approximate site of his actual residence.

History

The house itself was built from 1490 onwards, featuring a fine wooden gallery and hand-painted ceiling. It had belonged to Walter Reidpath whose grandson John Arres inherited it and left it to his daughter Mariota Arres in 1556. She married James Mosman, a goldsmith. Her father-in-law John Mosman, also a goldsmith, had refashioned the crown of Scotland for James V.

In 1567 James Mosman was converting a piece of Mary, Queen of Scots' jewelry when she was imprisoned in Lochleven Castle. He remained loyal to Mary when she was exiled in England. Mosman worked in Edinburgh Castle with James Cockie making coins for Mary's supporters who held the castle during the 'Lang Siege'. The two goldsmiths valued the jewels of Mary, Queen of Scots which remained in the castle, so they could be used as security for loans.

When the Castle surrendered in August 1573, Mosman was charged with counterfeiting, for which he was hanged, quartered and beheaded. The house was forfeit for the treachery, and was given in the name of James VI of Scotland to James Carmichael younger of that ilk.

The carvings were discovered behind woodwork in 1849, and restored in 1850 by Alexander Handyside Ritchie. The building was restored again in 1984.

Over the next few centuries many decorations and paintings were added, and the house and its contents are now a museum. The building is owned by the Church of Scotland and is now administered as part of the new, adjacent Scottish Storytelling Centre.

Association with John Knox

The visitor's pamphlet states that the house "was Knox's home only for a few months during the siege of Edinburgh Castle, but it is believed that he died here." It appears to have become widely accepted as "John Knox's House" from the mid-19th century onwards after Victorian writers like Robert Chambers and Sir Daniel Wilson had repeated the popular tradition, first recorded c.1800, of attaching Knox's name to it. The house looked old enough to fit the description, but no research was able to establish the rights or wrongs of the claim. Because of its visual prominence, however, it is almost certain that the building would have been familiar to Knox. The location of his actual residence is marked by a plaque in Warriston Close which lies further up the slope of the High Street. After the Disruption in the Church of Scotland in 1843, the house was bought by the new Free Church, a fact which may have strengthened belief in its association with Knox. It was condemned and due for demolition by the Town Council in 1849 but saved through the efforts of the pioneering urban conservationist Lord Cockburn.

The building immediately adjacent on the west side of the house is Moubray House. Its owner Robert Moubray also happened to be the owner of the house in Warriston's Close where Knox lodged in the 1560s.

See also
 Moubray House

Notes

References
Chambers, Robert and William Chambers's Edinburgh Journal, volume VIII nos. 183-200 July-December (1847), 231. Description of John Knox House in 1847.
Guthrie, Charles John, John Knox and John Knox's House, Constable (1905).
Guthrie, Charles John, 'Traditional Belief in John Knox's House Vindicated', in Proceedings Society Antiquaries Scotland, vol.34 (1899), 249-273, (conclusions not now accepted)
Smith, Donald, John Knox House, Gateway to Edinburgh's Old Town, John Donald (1996) 
Miller, Robert, John Knox and the Town Council of Edinburgh, Andrew Elliot (1898)
Miller, Robert, 'Where did John Knox live in Edinburgh?', in  Proceedings Society Antiquaries Scotland, vol.33 (1899) 80-115, (general conclusions widely accepted)

External links

 Scottish Storytelling Centre

Buildings and structures completed in 1490
Houses completed in the 15th century
Category A listed buildings in Edinburgh
Category A listed houses in Scotland
Museums in Edinburgh
Biographical museums in Scotland
Royal Mile
Hippolyte Blanc buildings
Religious museums in Scotland
Historic house museums in Edinburgh
History museums in Scotland
Renaissance in Scotland
Church of Scotland
Mosman family